CenturyTel of Colorado, Inc. is a telephone operating company owned by CenturyLink that provides local telephone service in Colorado, including Pagosa Springs. The company is separate from CenturyTel of Eagle and Qwest Corporation, the other telephone companies CenturyLink owns in Colorado.

The company was established in 1976 as the Universal Telephone Company of Colorado. The company is a reincorporation of the original company Universal Telephone owned serving Colorado, as the company forgot to file an annual report with the state and suffered an administrative dissolution.

The company was acquired by Century Telephone in 1990 and in 1996 changed its name to Century Telephone of Colorado, Inc. In 1998, the company changed its name to CenturyTel of Colorado, Inc.

The company does business as CenturyLink, a name it adopted in 2009 following the acquisition of Embarq.

See also
CenturyLink

References

American companies established in 1976
Lumen Technologies
Communications in Colorado
Telecommunications companies of the United States